Walhalla wacht (translation: "Valhalla Awaits") is the second studio album by the Dutch folk/Viking metal band Heidevolk, released in March 2008. Its North American release coincided with the Napalm Records re-release of their previous full-length album, De strijdlust is geboren.

Track listing

Personnel
 Joost Westdijk - drums, backing vocals
 Joris Boghtdrincker - vocals, acoustic guitar, midwinterhorn, bullhorn
 Mark Bockting - vocals
 Reamon Bloem - guitars, backing vocals
 Rowan Middelwijk - bass, backing vocals, beatring
 Sebas Bloeddorst - guitars, backing vocals, bull horn

Guest musicians
 Stefanie Achatz - violin
 Davis Miles - tin whistle

Release history

The album was released in Finland March 26, 2008, then in Germany, Austria and Switzerland on March 28. In the rest of Europe it was released March 31 and in North America April 22.

References

2008 albums
Heidevolk albums
Napalm Records albums